Palestinian law is the law  administered by the Palestinian National Authority within the territory pursuant to the Oslo Accords.  It has an unusually unsettled status, as of 2021, due to the complex legal history of the area. Palestinian law includes many of the legal regimes and precepts used in Palestinian ruled territory and administered by the Palestinian Authority (West Bank areas A and B) and Hamas (Gaza Strip), which is not an independent nation-state.

The scope of this article is to explain the legal history, context and development of law, the current fields of study of law in Palestinian ruled territory, as well as the state of lawlessness in those territories.  It is also to discuss the domestic and international positions on which set of laws are controlling in Palestinian ruled territory today.

Terminology
Due to the changing usages of the terms "Palestine" and "Palestinian" throughout history, the term may also be associated with regimes that are not associated with the Palestinian law of today.  Examples include the discussion (in a reference work dating from 1906) of the Talmudic interpretation of laws from Palestine before 70 AD, also known as Halakha: "Those of the laws of Palestine that were extended after the Exile were originally enacted for the purpose of protecting the judicial administration and economic interests of Palestine, and with a view to encourage settlement there." Such references to ancient Palestinian law do not apply to the Palestinian legal situation since at least 1948.

Jurisdictional background

Essentially, says one legal scholar, "the legal system in 'Palestine' consists of layer upon layer of law that almost all remain in effect."  The major issue is the:

The laws that applied come from many jurisdictions through history: "Customary Law ... Ottoman Law ... British Law ... Jordanian Law ... Egyptian Law ... Israeli" law and even the informal strictures of the intifada, and finally, the Palestinian National Authority's Basic law.

The subject of sovereignty is both controversial and unsettled; "neither the PLO nor the PA is recognized as a sovereign state by the United States.

Basic Law
The Basic law, established in 2002, is the proposed constitution of a future Palestinian state.  According to one report, "Palestinians had been requesting that the law be signed into effect since 1997, in order to formally guarantee a modicum of basic rights."  It was enacted by the PLC (the Legislature of PNA) and signed by Yasser Arafat.  It was amended on March 19, 2003 "to allow the creation of the Prime Minister Position in the Palestinian National Authority...."

The Basic Law is based loosely on Shari'a:

The Basic Law is introduced with "In The Name of God, The Merciful, The Compassionate," as are most documents in Islamic countries.

Articles of the Basic Law
With 121 articles, it is more akin to a state constitution in comprehensiveness, detail and length.

The "bill of rights" Articles of the Basic Law, as amended March 19, 2003, cover the following topics:
 "Palestine is part of the large[r] Arab World ...."
 "The People is the source of power" and the 3 branches of government enshrines "the principle of separation of powers" 
 States that "Jerusalem is the Capital of Palestine."
 Islamic law is the basis, and Arabic is the official language, of Palestine
 Creates "a democratic parliamentary system based on political and party pluralism" and a popularly elected President
 Recognizes the "principle of the rule of law" 
 Regulates citizenship
 Defines the official flag
 Protects against "discrimination because of race, sex, color, religion, political views, or disability" 
 Protection of human rights
 Protection of freedom and procedural due process
 Rights to "be informed of the reasons for his arrest or detention", to contact an attorney, and a speedy trial (see Miranda rights)
 No duress, torture or forced confessions
 Rights to be "innocent until proven guilty", to a defense, and to a lawyer for defense
 Crime and punishment defined by law
 Right to bodily integrity
 Prohibition of searches except by lawful order
 Freedom of private religious practice ("Freedom of belief, worship, and performance of religious rituals are guaranteed, provided that they do not violate public order or public morals.")
 Freedom of expression
 Freedom of movement
 Creation of a free market economy and prohibition against taking without fair compensation
 Insurance for health, disability, retirement, "welfare of families of martyrs’", and prisoners of war
 Right to housing
 Right to an education

Statutes and legislation
There is some confusion amongst jurists, scholars and laymen about exactly what legal regime exists, and which laws apply, in Palestinian ruled territory.

Mahdi Abdul Hadi, a legal scholar, believes that all prior and current law continues to apply in the Palestinian territories, including "the British Mandate laws, the Jordanian laws that used to govern the West Bank before 1967 and the Egyptian law that governed Gaza Strip before 1967, in addition to the Israeli military orders." According to Abdul Hadi, the first step was the organization of "Palestinian civil society", that is, a traditional law, "then came the Madrid Conference and the Oslo Accords which drafted laws to govern the Palestinian political life for the interim period."  Following that, "the general elections in 1996 ... brought about the Palestinian Legislative Council as the legislative body of the Palestinian people in the Palestinian lands."

Ottoman law has governed Palestine since 1517, and the Ottoman Land Code of 1858 is still in force, one of the causes of international controversy over land seizures. The Ottoman statutory "codification mirrored Islamic law but also incorporated elements of European law, especially the law of France."

Judicial and customary law

Islamic customary law applies in Palestinian ruled territory:

The term urf, meaning "to know", refers to the customs and practices of a given society. Although this was not formally included in Islamic law, the Sharia recognizes customs that prevailed at the time of Muhammad but were not abrogated by the Qur'an or the tradition (this is called "Divine silence"). Practices later innovated are also justified, since Islamic tradition says what the people, in general, consider good is also considered as such by God. Urf is the Islamic equivalent of "common law".

In the application of urf, custom that is accepted into law should be commonly prevalent in the region, not merely in an isolated locality; jurists also tend, with caution, to give precedence to custom over doctoral opinions of highly esteemed scholars.

Criminal law

For the most part, crimes and violent acts are considered crimes of violence and fall under the purview of the criminal justice system. The Palestinian Authority operates under its own criminal law, such as its Penal Code. In addition, "the Palestinian Authority also imposes the death penalty pursuant to the PLO Revolutionary Penal Code, of 1979." The PNA utilizes both military and special, state security courts for most death penalty cases.<ref>Death Penalty in the PA B'Tselem</s></ref>

Civil law
Civil law used the customary law in Palestine: "Urf covered disputes such as contracts, family disputes, personal injury, and land matters."

Participatory justice
Through the use of urf, Palestinians use alternative dispute resolution, specifically forms of participatory justice: "This system stressed conciliation, mediation, and family honour."

Palestinian Land Law

The Palestinian Land Law is a law that prohibits Palestinians from selling land to Jewish citizens of Israel. The punishment for violators is the death penalty.

See also

 Conflict of Laws
 Law of Israel
 Criminal procedure
 The Environmental Provisions of Oslo II Accords
 Golan Heights Law
 Hamas, the de facto government of the Gaza Strip
 International criminal law
 Islamic jurisprudence
 Ma'ruf
 Sources of Islamic law
 List of Islamic terms in Arabic
 Ulema
 Urf

References

External links
 Boyle, Francis A., The Fruits of Faith: Palestine, Palestinians & International Law, (Clarity Press, Atlanta 2003)  see Bookmasters web site
 Bibliography of Palestinian Laws and Human Rights

 
Palestinian politics
Civil law (common law)
Sharia